The 1922 United States Senate election in California was held on November 7, 1922. Incumbent Republican Senator Hiram Johnson was re-elected to his second term in office.

His greatest challenge came from fellow Republican Charles C. Moore, a citrus and olive rancher.

Republican primary

Candidates
 Hiram Johnson, incumbent Senator
 Charles C. Moore, businessman and agriculturalist

Results

Democratic primary

Candidates
 William J. Pearson, farmer

Results
William J. Pearson was unopposed on the ballot, but some primary voters wrote in Republicans Hiram Johnson or Charles C. Moore.

General election

Candidates
Hiram Johnson, incumbent Senator (Republican)
Henry Clay Needham, Los Angeles County Supervisor and businessman (Prohibition)
William J. Pearson, farmer (Democratic)
Upton Sinclair, journalist and novelist (Socialist)

Results

See also 
  1922 United States Senate elections

References 

1922 California elections
California
1922